Masahiro Ando, Masahiro Andoh or Masahiro Andō may refer to:

 Masahiro Andō (animator), a Japanese animator for the television series Sirius the Jaeger
 Masahiro Andō (director), a Japanese anime director for the television series Hanasaku Iroha
 Masahiro Ando (footballer), a Japanese footballer
 Masahiro Andoh, a Japanese musician